Antigonus II Mattathias ( Antígonos; , Matīṯyāhū), also known as Antigonus the Hasmonean (died 37 BCE) was the last Hasmonean king of Judea. A puppet king installed by the Parthians, he was the son of King Aristobulus II of Judea. In 37 BCE Herod handed him over to the Romans for execution, after Antigonus's three-year reign during which he led the Jews' fierce struggle for independence against the Romans.

Rome
Antigonus was the second son of Aristobulus II, and together with his father, were carried off to Rome as prisoners by Pompey in 63 BCE. Antigonus eventually escaped and returned to Judaea in 57 BCE. Despite an unsuccessful attempt to oppose the Roman forces there, the senate released him, yet he refused to surrender his dynastic rights. After the death of his older brother Alexander, Antigonus claimed that his uncle Hyrcanus II was a puppet of the Idumaean Antipater and attempted to overthrow him with the help and consent of the Romans. He visited Julius Caesar, who was in Syria in 47 BCE, and complained of the usurpation of Antipater and Hyrcanus II. In 42 BCE, he attempted to seize the government of Judaea by force with the assistance of his brother-in-law, Ptolemy, but was defeated by Herod.

Parthian support
The excessive taxation wrung from the people to pay for the extravagances of Mark Antony and Cleopatra had inspired a deep hatred against Rome. Antigonus gained the allegiance of both the aristocratic class in Jerusalem and the leaders of the Pharisees. The Parthians, who invaded Syria in 40 BCE, preferred to see an anti-Roman ruler on the throne of Judaea. When Antigonus promised them large sums of gold as well as five hundred female slaves, the Parthians put five hundred warriors at his disposal. After Antigonus, with Parthian help, conquered Jerusalem, Hyrcanus was sent to Babylon after having his ears mutilated, which rendered him unfit for the office of High Priest of Israel. Herod fled from Jerusalem, and in 40 BCE Antigonus was officially proclaimed king and high priest by the Parthians.

Death of Antigonus 
Following the conquest of Jerusalem by the Parthians, Herod fled quickly from Masada to Rome, where he was nominated in 40 BCE as the new king of Judea (allied king and friend of the Roman people) by the Senate on the recommendation of the triumvir Mark Antony. On Herod's return to Judaea from Rome in 39 BCE he opened a campaign against Antigonus and laid siege to Jerusalem. In the spring of 38 BCE, Herod wrested control of the province of Galilee and eventually all of Judea other than Jerusalem. Due to the approach of winter, Herod postponed his siege of Jerusalem, where Antigonus and the remnants of his army took refuge, until spring. Herod and a supporting Roman army were kept out of Jerusalem for 3–5 months but the Romans did eventually capture the city.  The supporters of Antigonus fought until the Romans reached the inner courtyard of the Temple. Antigonus was taken to Antioch and executed, ending Hasmonean rule.

Josephus states that Mark Antony beheaded Antigonus (Antiquities, XV 1:2 (8–9). Roman historian Cassius Dio says that he was crucified and records in his Roman History: "These people [the Jews] Antony entrusted to a certain Herod to govern; but Antigonus he bound to a cross and scourged, a punishment no other king had suffered at the hands of the Romans, and so slew him." In his Life of Antony, Plutarch claims that Antony had Antigonus beheaded, "the first example of that punishment being inflicted on a king."

Disputed tomb in Jerusalem 
In 1971, bulldozers removing earth in East Jerusalem for a construction project uncovered a tomb with an inscription that, according to some opinions, indicated that this was the tomb of King Antigonus, the last Hasmonean king. However, according to anthropologist Joe Zias, former Curator of Archaeology and Anthropology for the Israel Antiquities Authority, this theory is just little more than an urban myth, since the only beheaded skeleton found in 1971 and at the later re-examination of the previously untouched tomb, belonged to an elderly woman. In his view, no other set of remains found there could be associated with King Antigonus II and it is only due to the efforts of the owner of the building located on top of the tomb that the myth is still being promoted (as seen here:).

Qumran Scrolls connection 
Biblical scholar Gregory Doudna proposed in 2013 that Antigonus II Mattathias was the figure known as the Wicked Priest in the Qumran Scrolls. According to Doudna, Antigonus was the figure underlying the 'Wicked Priest' of Pesher Habakkuk, and the doomed ruler of Pesher Nahum, documents found at Qumran.

References

Sources

External links 
Antigonus entry in historical sourcebook by Mahlon H. Smith

1st-century BC births
37 BC deaths
1st-century BC Hasmonean monarchs
1st-century BCE High Priests of Israel
Jewish royalty
Kings of ancient Judah
People executed by the Roman Republic
Executed monarchs
People executed by decapitation
People executed by crucifixion
Vassal rulers of the Parthian Empire